Bammigatti is a village in Dharwad district of Karnataka, India.

Demographics
As of the 2011 Census of India there were 806 households in Bammigatti and a total population of 3,731 consisting of 1,945 males and 1,786 females. There were 424 children ages 0-6.

References

Villages in Dharwad district